Chronogaster elegans is a species of nematodes. It is found in fresh water in the USA.

The Encyclopedia of Life (eol) places the genus in the order Araeolaimida and the family Leptolaimidae whereas Wikispecies and the World Register of Marine Species (WoRMS) place the genus in the order Plectida, superfamily Plectoidea and family Chronogastridae, where it is the type genus of the family.

References

External links 

 Chronogaster elegans at the World Register of Marine Spacies (WoRMS)

Araeolaimida
Nematodes described in 1984
Freshwater animals
Fauna of the United States
Fauna without expected TNC conservation status